Abts, a variation of the surname Abt, is an occupational surname of Dutch and German origin derived from the clerical title of abbot. Notable people with the surname include:

 Matt Abts (born 1953), American drummer
 Tomma Abts (born 1967), German artist and abstract painter
 Wouter Abts, Flemish painter

See also 
 ABTS, a chemical compound used to observe the reaction kinetics of specific enzymes
 Abt (disambiguation)

References 

German-language surnames